Haematomis is a genus of moths in the family Erebidae erected by George Hampson in 1900.

Species
Haematomis mexicana (H. Druce, 1885)
Haematomis radians Dyar, 1907
Haematomis uniformis Schaus, 1899

References

Cisthenina
Moth genera